William D. Stamps (June 21, 1911 – June 1, 1980) was an American football player and coach. He served as a football coach at Duncan High School in Duncan, Oklahoma before serving as the head football coach at Cameron University (1947) and Midwestern State University (1948–1950). Stamps played college football at Southern Methodist University.

Head coaching record

College

References

External links
 

1911 births
1980 deaths
American football guards
Cameron Aggies football coaches
Midwestern State Mustangs football coaches
SMU Mustangs football players
High school football coaches in Oklahoma